Ali Bozayeh (also Romanized as ‘Alī Bozāyeh) is a village in Gafsheh-ye Lasht-e Nesha Rural District, Lasht-e Nesha District, Rasht County, Gilan Province, Iran. At the 2006 census, its population was 652, in 205 families.

References 

Populated places in Rasht County